Jangdam is a village and township of Samzhubzê District (Shigatse City), in the Tibet Autonomous Region of China. It is the location of the Shigatse Peace Airport serving the city., it had 15 villages under its administration.

References 

Township-level divisions of Tibet
Samzhubzê District